Peter Markle (born September 24, 1952) is an American film director, television director and screenwriter.  He has directed episodes of Everwood, CSI: Crime Scene Investigation, The X-Files, as well as many other programs. He was director of the 2006 television film Flight 93, and he also directed the 1982 romantic comedy film The Personals and the 1994 comedy western film Wagons East.

Markle married actress Melinda Culea in 1996.

Filmography 
 The Personals (1982)
 Hot Dog…The Movie (1984)
 Youngblood (1986)
 Bat*21 (1988)
 Breaking Point (1989)
 Nightbreaker (1989)
 El Diablo (1990)
 Through the Eyes of a Killer (1992)
 Wagons East (1994)
 White Dwarf (1995)
 The Last Days of Frankie the Fly (1996)
 Virginia's Run (2002)
 Saving Jessica Lynch (2003) (TV)
 Faith of My Fathers (2005)
 Flight 93 (2006) (TV)
 The Tenth Circle (2008) (TV)
 High Noon (2009) (TV)
 Odds Are... (2018)

References

External links 
 

1952 births
Living people
Film producers from Pennsylvania
American male screenwriters
American television directors
People from Danville, Pennsylvania
Film directors from Pennsylvania
Screenwriters from Pennsylvania